The following radio stations broadcast on AM frequency 1200 kHz: 1200 AM is classified by the Federal Communications Commission as a United States clear-channel frequency.  WOAI San Antonio is the dominant Class A station.

In Argentina
 LRF203 in Esquel, Chubut
 LT6 in Goya, Corrientes

In Canada

In Mexico
 XEPAS-AM in Punta Abreojos, Baja California Sur
 XECPAC-AM in Jalpan de Serra, Querétaro

In the United States
Stations in bold are clear-channel stations.

References

Lists of radio stations by frequency